Kootenay West—Revelstoke  was a federal electoral district in British Columbia, Canada, that was represented in the House of Commons of Canada from 1988 to 1997. This riding was created in 1987 from Kootenay West riding. It was eliminated in 1996 when it was merged into the new riding of West Kootenay—Okanagan.

It consisted of Electoral Area B of the Columbia-Shuswap Regional District, the city of Revelstoke, the northwest part of the Central Kootenay Regional District, and the eastern part of the Kootenay Boundary Regional District.

Members of Parliament

Election results

See also 

 List of Canadian federal electoral districts
 Past Canadian electoral districts

External links
Riding history from the Library of Parliament

Former federal electoral districts of British Columbia

Revelstoke, British Columbia